The Rhoda and Bernard Sarnat International Prize in Mental Health was established in 1992 and is awarded annually by the National Academy of Medicine in the United States to recognize individuals, groups, or organizations for outstanding achievement in improving mental health. It is accompanied by a medal and $20,000.

Recipients
2022: Daniel Geschwind, University of California, Los Angeles
2021: Spero Manson, University of Colorado
2020: Stephen P. Hinshaw, University of California, Berkeley and University of California, San Francisco
2019: Daniel Weinberger, Lieber Institute for Brain Development
2018: Kenneth B. Wells, UCLA David Geffen School of Medicine
2017: Joseph T. Coyle, Harvard Medical School and McLean Hospital, Catherine Lord, Weill Cornell Medical College and Matthew State, University of California, San Francisco
2016: Steven Hyman, Stanley Institute and Robin Murray, King's College, London
2015: Kay Redfield Jamison, Johns Hopkins University School of Medicine and Kenneth S. Kendler, Virginia Institute for Psychiatric and Behavioral Genetics
2014: Vikram Patel, London School of Hygiene and Tropical Medicine
2013: William T. Carpenter, University of Maryland School of Medicine
2012: Huda Akil and Stanley J. Watson, University of Michigan, Ann Arbor
2011: William E. Bunney, University of California, Irvine, School of Medicine
2010: Eric J. Nestler, Friedman Brain Institute/Mount Sinai School of Medicine and Charles P. O'Brien, University of Pennsylvania School of Medicine
2009: David Mechanic, Institute for Health, Health Care Policy, and Aging Research/Rutgers University
2008: Paul R. McHugh, Johns Hopkins Bloomberg School of Public Health
2007: Beatrix Hamburg and David Hamburg, Weill Cornell Medical College
2006: Jack D. Barchas, Weill Cornell Medical College
2005: Floyd E. Bloom, Neurome, Inc
2004: Albert J. Stunkard, University of Pennsylvania
2003: Aaron T. Beck, University of Pennsylvania
2002: David Satcher, Morehouse School of Medicine
2001: Michael L. Rutter, Kings College, London and Solomon H. Snyder, Johns Hopkins University School of Medicine
2000: Rosalynn Carter, The Carter Centre
1999: Nancy C. Andreasen, University of Iowa Hospitals and Clinics
1998: David Kupfer, University of Pittsburgh Medical Centre
1997: Herbert Pardes, Columbia University College of Physicians and Surgeons
1996: Leon Eisenberg, Harvard Medical School
1995: Samuel B. Guze, Barnes and Renard Hospital
1994: Myrna Weissman, Columbia University College of Physicians and Surgeons and Gerald Klerman, Cornell University Medical College
1993: Seymour S. Kety, Harvard Medical School
1992: Daniel X. Freedman, University of California, Los Angeles, School of Medicine

See also

 List of medicine awards
 List of prizes named after people

References

Medicine awards
American awards
Awards established in 1992